Nazlı Çağla Dönertaş (born March 1, 1991, in İstanbul, Turkey) is a Turkish yacht racer.

She began with sailing sport 2004 in Marmaris Yacht Club and transferred in 2007 to Fenerbahçe Sailing in Istanbul, where she is coached by Kemal Muslubas and Begüm Güngör.

She became national champion in the Women's 470 class at the Turkish Championships held on September 9–13, 2008 off Çayırova, Kocaeli Province.  She finished first in the Women's Laser Radial class at the 2010 Turkish Sailing Championships held off Bodrum, Muğla Province. She repeated her success in the Overall and Women's category at the 2011 Turkish Sailing Championships held off Didim, Province.

Dönertaş obtained her first international success with a bronze medal in the Women's Laser Radial class at the 2010 Athens Eurolymp Week in Greece. She became champion in the Women's Laser Radial class at the 2010 Balkan & Open Sailing Championship off Burgas, Bulgaria. At the 2011 Balkan & Open Sailing Championship in the Gulf of Izmit, Kocaeli Province, she won again the gold medal in the Laser radial class. In May 2012, she placed 5th at the Delta Lloyd Regatta 2012 off Medemblik, Netherlands.

She is qualified to participate at the 2012 Summer Olympics.  At the 2012 Olympics, she finished in 29th place.

At the 2013 World Laser Radial Championship, she finished in 12th.  At the 2016 World Laser Radial Championship, she finished in 8th.  That year, she also qualified for the Olympics, where she finished in 15th.

Achievements

References

1991 births
Living people
Turkish sportswomen
Turkish female sailors (sport)
Olympic sailors of Turkey
Sailors at the 2012 Summer Olympics – Laser Radial
Fenerbahçe athletes
Sportspeople from Istanbul
Sailors at the 2016 Summer Olympics – Laser Radial
Mediterranean Games bronze medalists for Turkey
Competitors at the 2013 Mediterranean Games
Competitors at the 2018 Mediterranean Games
Mediterranean Games medalists in sailing